The 2015–16 Luxembourg Cup was the 91st version of the annual knockout tournament. The competition began on 28 August 2015 and ended with the final on 29 May 2016.

Format
This season, the Luxembourg Cup was a single elimination knockout tournament contested by 104 teams. The winner of the cup earned a spot in the Europa League. Matches which are level after regulation went to extra time and then to penalties in order to determine a winner.

Schedule

First round
Sixteen first round matches were played between 28–30 August 2015.

Second round
Sixteen second round matches were played between 11–13 September 2015.

Third round
Twenty-two third round matches were played between 2–4 October 2015.

Fourth round
Eighteen fourth round matches were played 30–31 October 2015.

Fifth round
Sixteen fifth round matches were played between 20–25 November 2015.

Sixth round
The sixteen winners of the fifth round competed in this round. The matches were played on 5 and 6 December 2015.

Quarter-finals
The eight winners of the sixth round competed in this round. The matches were played on 19 April 2016.

Semi-finals
The four winners of the quarter-finals competed in this round. The matches were played on 5 May 2016.

Final
The final match was played on 29 May 2016.

See also
 2015–16 Luxembourg National Division

References

External links
soccerway.com
uefa.com

Luxembourg Cup seasons
Luxembourg
Cup